Irenio José Soares Filho (born 27 May 1975), known as Irenio Soares or Irênio, is a Brazilian former  footballer who played as an attacking midfielder.

Career 
Born in Carangola, Soares was labeled as an offensive midfielder who mainly plays down the left side of the pitch. He caught the eye of Mexican executives after a successful stint in his native country. After debuting in the Brazilian league playing for Minas Gerais in 1996, Soares was transferred to Atlético Mineiro, and after one year at Mineiro, he was once again transferred, this time to Portuguesa.

His play at Portuguesa brought him international attention, and he eventually landed in Monterrey, Mexico - where he signed for UANL Tigres. At Tigres, Soares quickly consolidated himself as a key part of an offense that featured Argentine standouts Walter Gaitan and Néstor Andrés Silvera, as well as Brazilian striker Kleber. Soares was part of a Tigres team that reached the Apertura 2003 finals against eventual champions CF Pachuca. After the Clausura 2005 season, Soares was transferred to Club América, which had won their tenth championship at the end of Clausura 2005.

The following season, Soares played 15 games and scored one goal, mostly coming on as a substitute, due to the strength of the team's roster. With his lone goal that season, Soares reached 30 scores in his 3.5 years playing in the Mexican league.

After playing in Club América, Soares was transferred to San Luis form whom he played and lost in the final against CF Pachuca.

For the 2007 season, he played for CD Veracruz.

In 2010, Irênio returned to América-MG.

Honours
Campeonato Brasileiro Série B: 1997
Copa Sul-minas: 2000

Contract
2010?

References

External links 
 
 
 
 
 CBF 

1975 births
Living people
Brazilian footballers
Brazilian expatriate footballers
Campeonato Brasileiro Série B players
Liga MX players
América Futebol Clube (MG) players
Clube Atlético Mineiro players
Associação Portuguesa de Desportos players
Tigres UANL footballers
Club América footballers
C.D. Veracruz footballers
Club Athletico Paranaense players
San Luis F.C. players
Expatriate footballers in Mexico
Association football midfielders